Hartley Shutt (9 November 1874–1950) was an English footballer who played in the Football League for Aston Villa.

References

1874 births
1950 deaths
English footballers
Association football defenders
English Football League players
Nelson F.C. players
Bolton Wanderers F.C. players
Swindon Town F.C. players
Millwall F.C. players
Aston Villa F.C. players
Colne F.C. players